The Battle of Schoenfeld took place on 1 March 1945 during World War II and was the scene of the last mounted charge in the history of the Polish cavalry and the last confirmed successful cavalry charge in world history. The Polish charge overran German defensive positions and forced a German retreat from the village of Schoenfeld (today known as Żeńsko, formerly known in Polish as Borujsko). Schoenfeld was part of the third line of fortifications built by the Germans to shelter Pomerania from attack.

An initial Polish attack on Schoenfeld with tanks and infantry of the 2nd Infantry Division floundered in the low, open wetlands that were dominated by the fire of infantry and antitank guns from Schoenfeld, which sat at a slightly higher elevation on a small hill (Hill 157). German troops defending the village were part of the 163rd Infantry Division.

The 1st "Warsaw" Independent Cavalry Brigade was then employed against the German position.  Two squadrons (companies) of cavalry supported by the elements of the horse--artillery company, having used a ravine to cover their approach to their infantry and tanker brothers-in-arms, charged through the smoke of burning tanks, and achieved tactical surprise with a swift mounted assault that overran the German antitank gun positions on the forward slope of Hill 157.  This success was followed by an attack into the village itself by the cavalry, who by this time had been joined by the infantry and tanks.  In the face of this development, the surviving German defenders withdrew, allowing the Poles to consolidate their gains in and around the village at 1700.
7 Polish cavalry men, 124 Polish infantry, and 16 tank men were dead for circa 500 dead Germans.

Today, a plaque mounted on a stone near the edge of Żeńsko commemorates the cavalry charge.

Citations

Notes

Sources 
 Krzysztof Komorowski, Boje Polskie 1939–1945, Warszawa: Bellona, 2009.
 Janusz Piekalkiewicz, The Cavalry of World War II, New York: Stein and Day, 1980.
 Steven J. Zaloga, The Polish Army 1939–45, Oxford: Osprey, 1998.
 www.polskaniezwykla.pl

Polish Land Forces
Polish cavalry
Schoenfeld